Sidi Chaib ( Arabic: سيدي شعيب) is a town and commune in Sidi Bel Abbès Province in north-western Algeria.

References

Communes of Sidi Bel Abbès Province